Azeri Baku FK was an Azerbaijani football club from Baku founded in 1991, and dissolved at the end of the 1993–94 season.

League and domestic cup history

References 

Azeri Baku
Association football clubs established in 1991
Defunct football clubs in Azerbaijan
Association football clubs disestablished in 1994
1991 establishments in Azerbaijan
1994 disestablishments in Azerbaijan